Magundi  is Grama Panchayat in Narasimharajapura Taluk, Chikkamagaluru District of Karnataka State. This place is Junction for Horanadu, Dharmastala, kottigehara and Sringeri route.

Villages in Chikkamagaluru district